In computer science, primitive data types are a set of basic data types from which all other data types are constructed. Specifically it often refers to the limited set of data representations in use by a particular processor, which all compiled programs must use. Most processors support a similar set of primitive data types, although the specific representations vary. More generally, "primitive data types" may refer to the standard data types built into a programming language. Data types which are not primitive are referred to as derived or composite.

Primitive types are almost always value types, but composite types may also be value types.

Common primitive data types

The Java virtual machine's set of primitive data types is:
 Integer types with a variety of ranges and precisions (byte, short, int, long, char)
 Floating-point number with single or double precisions;  (float, double)
 Boolean, logical values true and false. (boolean)
 A value referring to an executable memory address. (returnAddress) This is not accessible from the Java programming language and is usually left out.

These primitive types are in general precisely those supported by computer hardware, except possibly for varying integer sizes or hardware that is missing floating point. Operations on such primitives are usually quite efficient. Primitive data types which are native to the processor have a one-to-one correspondence with objects in the computer's memory, and operations on these types are often the fastest possible in most cases. Integer addition, for example, can be performed as a single machine instruction, and some offer specific instructions to process sequences of characters with a single instruction. But the choice of primitive data type may affect performance, for example it is faster using SIMD operations and data types to operate on an array of floats.

The set of basic C data types is similar to Java's. Minimally, there are four types, char, int, float, and double, but the qualifiers short, long, signed, and unsigned mean that C contains numerous target-dependent integer and floating-point primitive types.

Integer numbers

An integer data type represents some range of mathematical integers. Integers may be either signed (allowing negative values) or unsigned (non-negative integers only). Common ranges are:

Floating-point numbers

A floating-point number represents a limited-precision rational number that may have a fractional part. These numbers are stored internally in a format equivalent to scientific notation, typically in binary but sometimes in decimal. Because floating-point numbers have limited precision, only a subset of real or rational numbers are exactly representable; other numbers can be represented only approximately. Many languages have both a single precision (often called "float") and a double precision type (often called "double").

Booleans

A boolean type, typically denoted "bool" or "boolean", is typically a logical type that can have either the value "true" or the value "false". Although only one bit is necessary to accommodate the value set "true" and "false", programming languages typically implement boolean types as one or more bytes.

Many languages (e.g. Java, Pascal and Ada) implement booleans adhering to the concept of boolean as a distinct logical type. Some languages, though, may implicitly convert booleans to numeric types at times to give extended semantics to booleans and boolean expressions or to achieve backwards compatibility with earlier versions of the language. For example, early versions of the C programming language that followed ANSI C and its former standards did not have a dedicated boolean type. Instead, numeric values of zero are interpreted as "false", and any other value is interpreted as "true". The newer C99 added a distinct boolean type that can be included with stdbool.h, and C++ supports bool as a built-in type and "true" and "false" as reserved words.

XML Schema 

The XML Schema Definition language provides a set of 19 primitive data types:
 string: a string, a sequence of Unicode code points
 boolean: a boolean
 decimal: a number represented with decimal notation
 float and double: floating-point numbers
 duration, dateTime, time, date, gYearMonth, gYear, gMonthDay, gDay, and gMonth: Calendar dates and times
 hexBinary and base64Binary: binary data encoded as hexadecimal or Base64
 anyURI: a URI
 QName: a qualified name
 NOTATION: a QName declared as a notation in the schema. Notations are used to embed non-XML data types. This type cannot be used directly - only derived types that enumerate a limited set of QNames may be used.

Built-in types 

In JavaScript, there are 7 primitive data types: string, number, bigint, boolean, undefined, symbol, and null. These are not objects and have no methods.

In Visual Basic .NET, the primitive data types consist of 4 integral types, 2 floating-point types, a 16-byte decimal type, a boolean type, a date/time type, a Unicode character type, and a Unicode string type.

In general, data types that can be built into sophisticated programming languages include:
 Characters and strings (see below)
 Ranges (see below)
 Tuple in Standard ML, Python, Scala, Swift, Elixir
 List in Common Lisp, Python, Scheme, Haskell
 Fixed-point number  with a variety of precisions and a programmer-selected scale.
 Complex number in C99, Fortran, Common Lisp, Python, D, Go. This is two floating-point numbers, a real part and an imaginary part.
 Rational number in Common Lisp
 Arbitrary-precision Integer type in Common Lisp, Erlang, Haskell
 Associative array in Perl, PHP, Python, Ruby, JavaScript, Lua, D, Go
 Reference (also called a pointer or handle or descriptor),
 First-class function, in all functional languages, JavaScript, Lua, D, Go, and in newer standards of C++, Java, C#, Perl

Characters and strings
A character type is a type that can represent all Unicode characters, hence must be at least 21 bits wide. Some languages such as Julia include a true 32-bit Unicode character type as primitive. Other languages such as JavaScript, Python, Ruby, and many dialects of BASIC do not have a primitive character type but instead add strings as a primitive data type, typically using the UTF-8 encoding. Strings with a length of one are normally used to represent single characters.

Some languages have "character" or "string" types that are too small to represent all Unicode characters or strings. These are more properly categorized as integer types. For example C includes a char type, but it is defined to be the smallest addressable unit of memory, which several standards, such as POSIX require to be 8 bits. The recent version of these standards refer to char as a numeric type. char is also used for a 16-bit integer type in Java, but again this is not a Unicode character type. Some computer hardware has a few instructions which deal with "strings", referring to a sequence of bytes. For example, x86-64 can move, set, search, or compare a sequence of items, where an item could be 1, 2, 4, or 8 bytes long.

Ranges
A range numeric data type has its maximum and minimum value embedded in the type. It is included in some languages such as Ada and Pascal. Attempting to store a number outside the range may lead to compiler/runtime errors, or to incorrect calculations (due to truncation) depending on the language being used. In practice the compiler chooses the most appropriate primitive integer or floating-point type automatically.

See also
 Language primitive
 
 Object type
 Primitive wrapper class
 Variable (computer science)

References

External links

Data types